Hilal Cebeci (born 3 July 1976) is a Turkish pop singer.

Life 
In 1993, Cebeci worked with figures such as Eyyüp Bayram, Sinan Erkoç and Uğur Sönmezsoy and had her first experience in music. During this period, she made music videos for popular songs of the time for many other singers to be broadcast on private television channels and appeared on the television for the first time. She continued her career by establishing a music group and performing at famous hotels and restaurants of Istanbul. After graduating from Hamza Pasha Vocational High School for Girls in 1994, Cebeci started to perform at a number of night clubs for three years.

In September 2019, Cebeci revealed that she has been married since 2013.

Career 
With the release of her first album, Köylü Güzeli, in 1999, Cebeci received an award as the "Best female newcomer of the year" at the Kral TV Music Awards. In 2000, Near East University awarded her as the best newcomer female singer. With the success she earned by releasing her first album, she gave a number of public concerts in Turkey between 1999 and 2000. Köylü Güzeli sold 400,000 copies inside Turkey.

In 2001, she had a role in Ersin Pertan's movie Şarkıcı.

In 2003, Cebeci released her third album, Yükselme Zamanı, with which she re-achieved the success of her first album. In the music video for "İpe İpe", Cebeci appeared in outfits similar to those worn by Jennifer Lopez, Shakira and Kylie Minogue in the music videos. The music video turned out to be a success. Her duet song with Doğuş, "Üzülürsün", was turned into a music video and the song became one of the most  favorite slow songs of the year. The song "İnşallah (Ayırma Bizi Tanrım)" was also among the popular pieces in the album, and was performed by Hilal Cebeci at various programs. The song after which the album was named, "Yükselme Zamanı" was regularly played on radios. The album sold 130,000 copies in Turkey. To promote the album, Cebeci appeared on various TV programs, contests and talk shows, and was featured on the cover of a number of magazines.

Discography 
 1999: Köylü Güzeli
 2001: En Güzel Ben Severim
 2003: Yükselme Zamanı   
 2005: Kim Gitsin
 2008: Gelmişime Geçmişime
 2010: Aşk İçin
 2011: Gamsız Remix / duet with Doğuş
 2012: Özür Dilersen
 2014: Senden İyi Yaparım
 2018: Fokur Fokur
 2018: Bella Ciao

Filmography 
 2000: Tatlı Kaçıklar
 2000: Olacak O Kadar
 2001: Şarkıcı
 2004: Biz Boşanıyoruz
 2004: Şöhretler Kebapçısı
 2006: Cennet Mahallesi
 2008: Aşkım Aşkım

References

External links 
 Hilal Cebeci on Spotify

1976 births
Living people
Turkish pop singers
Turkish television presenters